Keel is the fourth album by the American glam metal band Keel, released on June 21, 1987. This was the last album to feature guitarists Marc Ferrari and Bryan Jay, as they left the band a year later (although Jay can be heard on the live portion of the band's next release, Larger Than Live.) They eventually re-joined Keel in 1998 to release Keel VI: Back in Action and again in 2009 for the band's 25th anniversary.

This was the band's first album since their 1984 debut Lay Down the Law to be produced by someone other than Gene Simmons. "Calm Before the Storm" was co-written by Jimmy Bain of Dio and Rainbow fame.

Track listing
Side one
 "United Nations" (Ron Keel) - 4:05
 "Somebody's Waiting" (Jack Ponti, Russ Arcara) - 3:09
 "Cherry Lane" (R. Keel, Kenny Chaisson, Dwain Miller) - 3:25
 "Calm Before the Storm" (R. Keel, Jimmy Bain) - 4:28
 "King of the Rock" (R. Keel, Chaisson, Marc Ferrari, Miller) - 3:22

Side two
 "It's a Jungle Out There" (R. Keel, Chaisson, Miller) - 3:46
 "I Said the Wrong Thing to the Right Girl" (R. Keel, Ferrari) - 4:20
 "Don't Say You Love Me" (Ponti, Arcara) - 3:37
 "If Love Is a Crime (I Wanna Be Convicted)" (Ferrari, Chaisson) - 3:45
 "4th of July" (Bryan Jay, R. Keel, Chaisson, Miller)- 3:50

Personnel
Band members
Ron Keel – vocals, guitar, keyboards
Marc Ferrari – guitars, backing vocals
Bryan Jay – guitars, backing vocals
Kenny Chaisson – bass, backing vocals
Dwain Miller – drums, backing vocals

Additional musicians
Jaime St. James - backing vocals on tracks 6 and 9

Production
Michael Wagener - producer, engineer, mixing
Garth Richardson - additional engineering
George Marino - mastering at Sterling Sound, New York

References

1987 albums
Keel (band) albums
MCA Records albums
Albums produced by Michael Wagener